Francisco Bartolomé Porró y Reinado, C.R.M. (15 October 1739 – 3 January 1814) was a Spanish prelate of the Roman Catholic Church. He served as Bishop of Louisiana and the Two Floridas (1801–1803) and Bishop of Tarazona (1803–1814).

Biography
Born in Gibraltar, Porró was a Franciscan of the Convent of the Holy Apostles in Rome. He was appointed Bishop of Louisiana and the Two Floridas in the United States on 20 July 1801 and received his episcopal consecration on the following 15 November from Cardinal Francisco Antonio de Lorenzana. However, he never took possession of the diocese; some say that he was never consecrated, he died before departing from Rome, or he never left because of a rumored sale of Louisiana.

On 17 January 1803 Porro was transferred to the See of Terrazona in Spain. He died in the position at age 74.

References

1739 births
1814 deaths
19th-century Roman Catholic bishops in the United States
Roman Catholic archbishops of New Orleans
19th-century Roman Catholic bishops in Spain
Spanish Roman Catholic bishops in North America
Spanish people from Gibraltar
Franciscan bishops
Bishops of Tarazona